The 2022 Rugby Europe Sevens Championship Series was the twentieth edition of the annual rugby sevens series organised by Rugby Europe, the governing body of rugby union in Europe, played from June to July 2022. The first leg was played in Lisbon, Portugal, with the second leg in Krakow, Poland. Ten teams competed. There was a separate 2022 Rugby World Cup Sevens European Qualifier event held in Bucharest in July. Spain were the defending champions, having won the 2021 tournament. Spain repeated as champions of the Series having finished runner-up in Lisbon and first in Krakow.

Teams
The current list of teams confirmed to be participating in the Sevens Championship Series. Russia were initially scheduled to participate, but following the 2022 Russian invasion of Ukraine, the World Rugby Executive Council suspended the Rugby Union of Russia. 

France, who were originally to be relegated to the 2022 Trophy tournament as punishment for not fielding a team in the previous year's Championship tournament, accepted an invitation to take Russia's place.

Belgium and the Czech Republic were promoted from the 2021 Rugby Europe Sevens Trophy, as they were the two highest-ranked teams from the two-legged series.

Tour venues
The schedule for the series was:

Standings

First leg – Lisbon

Pool stage

Pool A

Pool B

Ranking Games

Final

3rd-place play-off

5th-place play-off

7th-place play-off

9th-place play-off
 

Results

Second leg – Kraków

Pool stage

Pool A

Pool B

Knockout stage

9th-10th playoff

5th–8th playoffs

1st-4th playoffs

See also
 2021–22 World Rugby Sevens Series
 2022 Rugby World Cup Sevens

References

 

 
  
 
Rugby Europe Sevens
2022 rugby sevens competitions
2022 in Portuguese sport
2022 in Polish sport
June 2022 sports events in Portugal
July 2022 sports events in Poland